Dave Hutchison (1 March 1870 – 1 June 1956) was an Australian rules footballer who played with South Melbourne in the Victorian Football League (VFL).

Notes

External links 

1870 births
1956 deaths
Australian rules footballers from Victoria (Australia)
Sydney Swans players